Dots is a free mobile game produced by Betaworks and developed at American studio Playdots, Inc. It was released on April 30, 2013 for iOS and on August 15, 2013 for Android. It has both a single player and online multiplayer modes. A single-player sequel, Two Dots, was released on May 29, 2014.

Dots was initially produced as a test project examining user interaction with the iOS interface. Within a week after release, it was downloaded more than 1 million times and was the top free app in eight countries. Within two weeks, it had been downloaded 2 million times and users had played approximately 100 million games.

Reception

Coverage in the tech press focused on the game's simplicity and addictiveness. The New York Times  cited the simple interface as a good example of flat design and highlighted the creators' focus on "design with a big D". In an interview with Mashable, the creators suggested that Dots provides a test case for increasing user engagement, and that lessons learned through the app may be applied to other Betaworks properties such as Tapestry (app) or Digg. In another interview with The Wall Street Journals AllThingsD, the creators commented that they are focused on the user experience, not monetization.

It was awarded best game on handheld devices and best visual design for the 2014 Webby Awards.

References

2013 video games
Android (operating system) games
IOS games
Puzzle video games
Take-Two Interactive games
Video games developed in the United States